Molay is a commune in the Haute-Saône department in the region of Bourgogne-Franche-Comté in eastern France.

Notable people
 Jacques de Molay, last Grand Master of the Knights Templar, was born in Molay.

See also
Communes of the Haute-Saône department

References

Communes of Haute-Saône